John S. Porter may refer to:
 John Scott Porter (1801–1880), Irish biblical scholar and Unitarian minister
 John Porter (footballer, born 1961), Scottish former footballer